Luis Ramos may refer to:
 Luis Ramos (Uruguayan footballer) (born 1939), Uruguayan footballer
 Luis Ramos (Honduran footballer) (born 1985), Honduran footballer
 Luis Ramos (Venezuelan footballer)
 Luis Ramos (footballer, born 1999), Peruvian footballer
 Luis Ramos (fighter) (born 1981), Brazilian mixed martial artist
 Luis Ramos Jr. (born 1988), Mexican American boxer
 Luis Alberto Ramos (born 1953), former Argentine footballer
 Luis Alfredo Ramos (born 1948), Colombian politician
 Luis Antonio Ramos, Puerto Rican-born American actor
 Luis Gregorio Ramos (born 1953), Spanish sprint canoer
 Luis Rosendo Ramos (born 1957), retired road bicycle racer from Mexico
 Luis Vega Ramos (born 1970), Puerto Rican lawyer and politician
 Luis Manuel Ramos (born 1991), Mexican footballer